Frankenstein, MD is a 2014 American Gothic horror comedy webseries with transmedia elements. Produced in partnership between Pemberley Digital and PBS Digital Studios, the show is a modern adaptation of Mary Shelley's 1818 novel Frankenstein; or, The Modern Prometheus, replacing the eponymous character with Victoria Frankenstein, a medical student near graduation. The show, which represents PBS Digital's first foray into scripted content, was created by Bernie Su, Brett Register, and Lon Harris. It ran on YouTube from August 19 through October 31, 2014, and was generally well-received by critics.

Synopsis
Frankenstein, MD is presented as an educational webseries presented by medical students (and later doctors) Victoria Frankenstein and Iggy DeLacey from the fictional Engle State University. Each episode generally consists of Frankenstein experimenting with cutting-edge medical technologies or theories, often using DeLacey or her childhood friends Eli Lavenza and Rory Clerval as subjects. Dr. Abraham Waldman serves as an adviser to Frankenstein, usually acting as a foil and reminding her of the impracticality or perceived impossibility of her experiments and theories.

Partway through the series, the show's unseen camera operator and editor, Robert Walton, dies from a fall while adventuring in Alaska, where his body is left partially preserved in the snow. Frankenstein becomes distraught and attempts to revive Walton's corpse with DeLacey's help in secret using the medical technologies she had expounded upon earlier in the show. The attempt is successful, but the revived creature is startled by light and escapes the lab, running into the woods. Later, as Frankenstein and Lavenza are trying to locate the creature from her father's basement, Clerval is killed mysteriously while camping. The creature confronts Frankenstein and asks her to make him a friend. She grows morally opposed to the idea of recreating her experiment and agrees to run off to Costa Rica with Lavenza after he confesses his love to her. The creature returns to her makeshift lab and kills Lavenza in anger after he tries to stop it from hurting Frankenstein.

Production
Frankenstein, MD was announced in May 2014, in a partnership between PBS Digital Studios, the online arm of the American Public Broadcasting Service (PBS), and Pemberley Digital whose previous webseries included The Lizzie Bennet Diaries (an adaptation of Jane Austen's Pride and Prejudice) and Emma Approved (based on Austen's Emma). The show is a transmedia adaptation of Frankenstein; or, The Modern Prometheus by Mary Shelley that reimagines the story's male protagonist Victor Frankenstein as a female student of medicine named Victoria Frankenstein. The show is PBS Digital's first scripted program, though it also includes educational elements.

According to its writers, Frankenstein, MDs narrative fills a two-year gap left by Shelley's source text between Victor Frankenstein's time at medical school and his reappearance as a mad scientist. The original Frankenstein is driven to insanity by his ostracization and Frankenstein, MD attempted to recontextualize this concept by gender-swapping its lead. Victoria Frankenstein is a medical student and later doctor grappling with institutional sexism in what the creators called the "sort of a male-dominated profession" of medicine.

The show is produced by Bernie Su who was previously responsible for Pemberley Digital's other webseries. Filmed at YouTube's Space LA production studio, it premiered on the site on August 19, 2014. Prior to the show's premiere, accounts on social media for various characters in the show were created, allowing viewers to interact with Frankensteins protagonists. Joe Hanson, host of PBS Digital's It's Okay To Be Smart, acts as the show's science consultant. In early episodes of the show, Frankenstein neglected to wear gloves during her experiments which Su claimed was because, "real science and real-life procedures aren't sexy for entertainment". During its run, fans noticed this and called the show out for the error; in later episodes she is depicted with gloves on for all of her scientific work. The first season of the show concluded after 24 five- to eight-minute episodes on October 31, 2014.

Episodes of Frankenstein, MD are directed by Brett Register, executive produced by Su, and produced by Tracy Bitterolf with consulting producer by Frederick Kim. Register and Lon Harris serve as showrunners with the latter also working as head writer. Other writers include Kim, Danielle Evenson, and Taylor Brogan. The series's cinematographer is Matt Ryan.

Cast and characters

 Victoria Frankenstein (Anna Lore) – Analogous to Victor Frankenstein, she is a medical student described by The New York Observer as "smart, strong willed and filled with both an insatiable desire to learn about science and an unwavering belief in the field itself." According to Register, Frankenstein's character was not fully understood by the creators of the show until after Lore was cast on July 23, 2014. She helped them view the role as "this very confident but almost introverted character".
 Ludwig "Iggy" DeLacey (Steve Zaragoza) – Analogous to Igor, he is Frankenstein's fellow student and co-host of her show. Zaragoza mailed an audition tape to the show's producers before in-person auditions began which "set the bar for the character of Iggy" according to Register.
 Dr. Abraham Waldman (Kevin Rock) – Analogous to M. Waldman, he serves as a mentor to Frankenstein.
 Eli Lavenza (Brendan Bradley) – Analogous to Elizabeth Lavenza, he is one of Frankenstein's close friends.
 Rory Clerval (Sara Fletcher) – Analogous to Henry Clerval, she is another of Frankenstein's close friends.
 Robert Walton / The Creature (Evan Strand) – A combination of both Robert Walton and Frankenstein's monster from the novel, Walton is the camera operator for Frankenstein's vlog. He dies and is reanimated by her experiments. Lon Harris, a producer and writer of the series, chose Strand to perform The Creature because Strand's performance was very different from Boris Karloff's, and Tracy Bitterolf, a producer, praised Strand's control of his body.  Strand described his performance as being inspired by a five-year-old child, a silverback gorilla, and a rhinoceros.

Episodes

Reception
Reviewing the first three episodes of the show for The A.V. Club, Myles McNutt felt that the fact that the show was a coproduction of PBS and Pemberley Digital was "the most exciting part" but that it was also the element "that takes the most time to negotiate in the series’ first three episodes, as the writers and the audience alike adjust to the distinct goals of the science fiction vlog webseries." McNutt declared the first three episodes "a solid start" and rated them B+, B, and A−, respectively. Nicole Vranjican wrote in The New York Observer that the show "has a definite juvenile feel and is likely best suited for scientifically curious Jr. High students" and that its message "that being smart is cool...sets a standard for television that more TV shows should get behind". After viewing the first six episodes, Atiya Abbas noted in Vox Magazine that "[t]he series is light-hearted compared to the dark subject of the novel". On Hypable, Marama Whyte called the show "highly comedic" and noted its high production value and Anna Lore's "standout performance" as positive aspects.

References

Further reading

External links
 
 

2014 web series debuts
American comedy web series
Transmedia storytelling
Works based on Frankenstein
2010s YouTube series
PBS Digital Studios shows
2014 web series endings